Floyds Knobs is a small unincorporated community in Lafayette Township, Floyd County, Indiana, United States.  Historically a farming community on the outskirts of New Albany, it has since become a bedroom community for Louisville, Kentucky. It contains subdivisions, farms, small shopping centers, churches, and transmitters for many of the area's television and radio stations. It is also the location of Floyd Central High School and Floyd Knobs Elementary.

History
The town was named after Colonel Davis Floyd.  James Moore built a gristmill here in 1815. The word "knobs" comes from the local terrain.  As one approaches Floyds Knobs from the southeast, The Knobstone or Siltstone Escarpment rises 400–850 feet above the Ohio River floodplain along the northwestern edge of New Albany, Indiana. The eroded hills along the edge of this plateau, called knobs, are the eastern edge of the Norman Upland geologic area of Indiana. Floyds Knobs is home to PGA golfer Fuzzy Zoeller, as well as Terraria developers Re-Logic.

Historically, the commercial center of the community was at the intersection of Scottsville Road and Paoli Pike, (Old U.S. Highway 150) along the primary route from New Albany to Paoli, Indiana.  However, exit 119 on Interstate 64 (US 150) has substantial commercial and residential development west of the historic center.

Geography

Education
New Albany-Floyd County Consolidated School Corporation serves the community. Residents are assigned to Floyds Knobs Elementary School, Highland Hills Middle School, and Floyd Central High School.

References

Unincorporated communities in Floyd County, Indiana
Unincorporated communities in Indiana
Louisville metropolitan area